Below is a list of defunct restaurants of the United States.

Defunct restaurants in the United States

 Arthur Treacher's fish and chips, one location remains
 Big Daddy's Restaurants
 Bikinis Sports Bar & Grill
 Bill Knapp's
 Blue Boar Cafeterias
 Boston Sea Party
 Bresler's Ice Cream
 Briazz
 Brigham's a Boston-area ice cream parlor and restaurant chain that closed in 2013
 Britling Cafeterias
 Bugaboo Creek Steakhouse
 Burger Chef
 Carrols Restaurant Group
 Cheeseburger in Paradise
 Chi-Chi's
 Childs Restaurants
 China Coast
 Clifton's Cafeteria
 Clock
 Coon Chicken Inn
 Cuppy's Coffee
 Deco Refreshments, Inc.
 Dee's Drive-In
 Don Pablo's closed in 2019
 Druther's
 Dubrow's Cafeteria
 Earl Abel's
 Farrell's Ice Cream Parlour
 Forum Cafeterias
 Fresh Choice
 Geri's Hamburgers
 Gino's Hamburgers
 Henry's Hamburgers
 Holly Tree Inn
 Horn & Hardart
 Horne's
 Hot Shoppes, Inc.
 Howard Johnson's a restaurant chain that featured an iconic orange rooftop, reasonably priced, consistent-quality menu items; founded in 1929 by Howard Deering Johnson in Quincy, Massachusetts; at its cultural peak, it served more meals outside of the family home than any entity except for the US Army; in 1979 it had 1,040 locations, but only one franchise remained open in Lake George, New York until its owner was arrested in October 2017.
 Huyler's
 Isaly's
 JB's Restaurants
 Kahiki Supper Club
 Kenny Rogers Roasters
 La Petite Boulangerie
 Laughner's Cafeteria
 Little Tavern
 Lone Star Steakhouse parent company for other restaurants
 Lum's
 Lyon's
 Manning's Cafeterias
 Mighty Casey's
 Minnie Pearl's Fried Chicken
 Montana's Cookhouse
 Morrison's Cafeteria
 Mr. Fables
 Mr. Steak
 Nedick's
 Nickerson Farms
 Official All Star Café
 Pioneer Chicken
 Po' Folk's once owned by actor Burt Reynolds
 Pok Pok – Portland, Oregon and New York City
 Red Barn
 Rio Bravo Cantina
 Roadhouse Grill
 The Royal Canadian Pancake Houses
 Rustler Steak House
 S&W Cafeteria
 Sambo's
 Sandy's
 Schrafft's
 Sholl's Colonial Cafeteria
 ShopHouse Southeast Asian Kitchen
 ShowBiz Pizza Place
 Signatures Restaurant
 Sisters Chicken & Biscuits founded in 1979, this was Wendy's first attempt to expand beyond burgers
 Soul Daddy
 Specialty Restaurant Group
 Steak and Ale
 Steve's Ice Cream
 Sweet Tomatoes Founded in San Diego in 1978 and operated as Souplantation in California. Closed all locations temporarily in March 2020 due to the COVID-19 pandemic, but announced in May 2020 that the closure was permanent.
 Tasty Made
 Texas Land and Cattle peaked at 20 locations, only 1 remains in Austin
 Two Pesos
 Valle's Steak House
 Velvet Turtle
 Victoria Station one restaurant remained open in Salem, Massachusetts until it was abruptly closed in December 2017 
 VIP's Oregon-based restaurant chain
 Wag's
 Weenie Beenie
 Wetson's
 Whiskey Soda Lounge – Portland, Oregon and New York City
 White Tower Hamburgers
 Wimpy Grills founded in Bloomington, Indiana, in 1934; eventually grew to 25 locations within the United States and 1,500 outside of the U.S.; its international locations were eventually sold to J. Lyons and Co. in the United Kingdom, which remains open while all of the American locations eventually closed by 1978
 Yankee Doodle Dandy
 York Steak House one restaurant remains open in Columbus, Ohio
 Zantigo a revival of the Zantigo menu and format has seven restaurants in Minneapolis, Minnesota

California

 Anthology
 Atomic Cafe
 Bahooka
 Battle of the Dance
 Ben Frank's
 Brown Derby
 C.C. Brown's
 Café Montmartre
 Chasen's
 Dive!
 The Fat Cow
 Florentine Gardens
 Cafe Frankenstein
 Googies Coffee Shop
 Hamburger Hamlet
 Imperial Dynasty
 Johnie's Broiler
 Johnie's Coffee Shop
 The Linkery
 Little Joe's
 Ma Maison
 Maud's
 Moore's Delicatessen
 Naugles
 Nicky Blair's
 Noriega Hotel
 Nova Express Café
 Original Spanish Kitchen
 Pasta Bravo
 Perino's
 Pup 'N' Taco
 Scrivner's Drive-In
 Ships Coffee Shop
 Tiny Naylor's
 Van de Kamp's Holland Dutch Bakeries
 Wich Stand
 Zombie Hut

Maryland

 Anchor Inn
 Chicken George
 Martick's Restaurant Francais
 Maryland Food Collective
 Punk's Backyard Grill
 White Coffee Pot

Massachusetts

 Anthony's Pier 4
 Biba
 Brigham's Ice Cream
 Doyle's Cafe
 Durgin-Park
 East Coast Grill
 L'Espalier
 Hilltop Steak House
 Jacob Wirth Restaurant
 Locke-Ober
 Tasty Sandwich Shop
 Upstairs On the Square

New York

 Asti
 Beefsteak Charlie's
 Bridge Cafe
 Browne's Chop House
 Café des Artistes
 Cafe Rouge
 La Caravelle
 Carnegie Deli
 The Cattleman
 Cafe Chambord
 Chelsea Place
 Cloud Club
 The Coffee Shop
 The Colony
 Corton
 La Côte Basque
 Da Silvano
 Del Pezzo Restaurant
 Elaine's
 Fashion Cafe
 Florent
 FOOD
 The Gaslight Cafe
 Jekyll & Hyde Club
 Jimmy Ryan's
 Jimmy Weston's
 Kiev Restaurant
 Lafayette
 Lespinasse
 Lindy's
 Lobster Palace
 Lüchow's
 Lundy's Restaurant
 Lutèce
 Manganaro's
 Mars 2112
 Maxwell's Plum
 Mo Gridder's
 Moondance Diner
 Moon's Lake House
 Mori
 Munson Diner
 Café Nicholson
 Oak Room
 Onyx Club
 Le Pavillon
 Penny Cafeteria
 Pith
 The Quilted Giraffe
 Quo Vadis
 Ratner's
 Red Apple Rest
 Reisenweber's Cafe
 Reuben's Restaurant
 Shanley's Restaurants
 Sherry's
 The Spotted Pig
 Stage Deli
 Stock Exchange Luncheon Club
 Stork Club
 Toots Shor's Restaurant
 Windows on the World
 The World

Oregon

 Acadia: A New Orleans Bistro, Portland
 Alexis Restaurant, Portland
 Altabira City Tavern, Portland
 Analog Café and Theater, Portland
 Arleta Library Bakery & Cafe, Portland
 Ataula, Portland
 Aviary, Portland
 Baby Blue Pizza, Portland
 Bailey's Taproom, Portland
 Beast, Portland
 Berbati's Pan, Portland
 Berlin Inn, Portland
 Bistro Agnes, Portland
 Biwa, Portland
 Bluehour, Portland
 Bombay Cricket Club, Portland
 Brasserie Montmartre, Portland
 Bridges Cafe, Portland
 British Overseas Restaurant Corporation, Portland
 Byways Cafe, Portland
 Cafe Azul
 Candlelight Cafe & Bar, Portland
 Carriage Room, Portland
 Clyde Common, Portland
 Country Bill's, Portland
 Cup & Saucer Cafe, Portland
 Davis Street Tavern, Portland
 Der Rheinlander, Portland
 Dick's Kitchen, Portland
 Dig a Pony, Portland
 Dime Store, Portland
 Dóttir (restaurant), Portland
 El Gallo Taqueria, Portland
 Esparza's, Portland
 Everybody Eats PDX, Portland
 Fenouil, Portland
 Fish Grotto, Portland
 Fong Chong, Portland
 Genoa, Portland
 Greek Cusina
 Grüner, Portland
 Gypsy Restaurant and Velvet Lounge, Portland
 Handsome Pizza, Portland
 Henry Thiele Restaurant, Portland
 Hobo's, Portland
 Holy Trinity Barbecue, Portland
 House of Louie, Portland
 Hunan Restaurant, Portland
 Hung Far Low, Portland
 Irving Street Kitchen, Portland
 Isabel Pearl, Portland
 La Carreta Mexican Restaurant, Portland
 Le Bistro Montage, Portland
 Lincoln Restaurant, Portland
 The Liquor Store, Portland
 Little Bird Bistro, Portland
 Lonesome's Pizza, Portland
 Lovely Hula Hands, Portland
 Masia, Portland
 Mi Mero Mole, Portland
 Ned Ludd, Portland
 Nel Centro, Portland
 New Copper Penny, Portland
 NOLA Doughnuts
 Ocean City Seafood Restaurant, Portland
 Organ Grinder Restaurant, Portland
 Original Taco House
 Overlook Restaurant, Portland
 The Pagoda, Portland
 The Parish, Portland
 Pazzo Ristorante, Portland
 Pearl Tavern, Portland
 Ping, Portland
 Pink Feather, Portland
 Portland Penny Diner, Portland
 Portobello Vegan Trattoria, Portland
 Radar, Portland
 Red and Black Cafe, Portland
 Revelry, Portland
 Roman Candle, Portland
 The Roxy, Portland
 Saucebox, Portland
 Seastar Bakery, Portland
 Shift Drinks, Portland
 Shut Up and Eat, Portland
 Southeast Grind, Portland
 Stacked Sandwich Shop, Portland
 Stanich's, Portland
 Starky's, Portland
 Sunshine Tavern, Portland
 Tails & Trotters, Portland
 Tapalaya, Portland
 Tasty n Alder, Portland
 Tasty n Daughters, Portland
 Tasty n Sons, Portland
 Three Sisters Tavern, Portland
 Tilt, Portland
 Toro Bravo, Portland
 Touché Restaurant & Bar, Portland
 Vault Cocktail Lounge, Portland
 Veritable Quandary, Portland
 Victory Bar, Portland
 Wildwood, Portland
 Wong's King, Portland
 Yonder, Portland

Pennsylvania

 Le Bec-Fin
 Horn & Hardart
 Old Original Bookbinder's
 Palumbo's
 Tun Tavern

Texas

 Benjy's, Houston
 Dolce Vita, Houston
 Inversion Coffee House, Houston
 Shady Grove, Austin
 Yia Yia Mary's, Houston

Washington

 Andy's Diner, Seattle
 Country Dough, Seattle
 Dacha Diner, Seattle
 Iron Horse, Seattle
 Last Exit on Brooklyn, Seattle
 The London Plane, Seattle
 SkyCity, Seattle

See also

Lists of companies
List of defunct fast-food restaurant chains
List of defunct retailers of the United States

References

Restaurants
Defunct, United States